Kipawa is an administrative ward in the Ilala District of the Dar es Salaam Region of Tanzania. In 2016 the Tanzania National Bureau of Statistics report there were 92,891 people in the ward, from 74,180 in 2012.

The ward included Tanzania's primary international airport, Julius Nyerere International Airport.

References

Ilala District
Wards of Dar es Salaam Region